Tajapur (H)  is a village in the southern state of Karnataka, India. It is located in the Bijapur taluk of Bijapur district in Karnataka.

Demographics
 India census, Tajapur (H) had a population of 5907 with 3064 males and 2843 females.

See also
 Bijapur district, Karnataka
 Districts of Karnataka

References

External links
 http://Bijapur.nic.in/

Villages in Bijapur district, Karnataka